Coykendall Lodge is a historic home, now in ruins, located at Hardenburgh in Ulster County, New York. It is located on the shores of Alder Lake in the Balsam Lake Wild Forest, part of the Catskill Forest Preserve. It was built in 1899 and was a large, rambling -story half-timber lodge of balloon frame construction.  It rests on a limestone foundation and is representative of the Shingle Style.

It was listed on the National Register of Historic Places in 2002.

Since then the Lodge was torn down by the state as it was in such disrepair. Only the stone foundations and cobblestone walls remain.

See also
National Register of Historic Places listings in Ulster County, New York

References

Houses on the National Register of Historic Places in New York (state)
Shingle Style houses
Houses completed in 1899
Houses in Ulster County, New York
Queen Anne architecture in New York (state)
National Register of Historic Places in Ulster County, New York
Shingle Style architecture in New York (state)